The Nebraska Cornhuskers men's tennis team represents the University of Nebraska–Lincoln in the Big Ten Conference. The program was established in 1928 and has made the NCAA Championship twice, most recently in 2011. Five Cornhuskers have won conference championships, and seventeen have been named all-conference selections. In 1989, Steven Jung was the NCAA Singles runner-up and was named NU's first All-American. Jung is the only men's tennis player in the Nebraska Athletic Hall of Fame.

The team has been coached by Sean Maymi since 2018.

Coaches

Coaching history

Coaching staff

Players

NCAA Tournament qualifiers

Conference champions

Matthias Mueller – 1993
Ken Feuer / Matthias Mueller – 1990
Anthony Kotarac / Matthias Mueller – 1993
Adrian Maizey / Dinko Verzi – 1996
Dusty Boyer / Toby Boyer – 2015

All-conference selections

Season-by-season results

Notes

References

College men's tennis in the United States